Rafael Coello Ramos (1877 in Comayaguela – 1967 in Tegucigalpa) was the founder of Orquesta Verdi.

"Al Pino" (Hymn of the Pine)
"A Gutemberg" (To Gutemberg)
"Duelo Nacional (To the death of Genaeral Manuel Bonilla)
"Ave Maria" (Coello's Version)
"Vexilla Regis" (Coello's Version)
"Populeus Meus" (Coello's Version)
"Pater mi" (Coello's Version)

References

Lyricists
1877 births
1967 deaths
Honduran composers
Male composers
Honduran musicians
People from Tegucigalpa